Scarlino Scalo is a town in Tuscany, central Italy,  administratively a frazione of the comune of Scarlino, province of Grosseto.

Scarlino Scalo is about 39 km from Grosseto and 6 km from Scarlino, and it is situated in a plain at the bottom of the hill of Scarlino, near to the Aurelia Statal Road and along the Tirrenica railway line, which links Livorno and Pisa with Grosseto and Rome.

Main sights 
 Madonna delle Grazie, main parish church of the town, it was built in 1984.
 Palazzo Guelfi, former house of Angiolo Guelfi, it is now an Italian National Monument because it became shelter of national hero Giuseppe Garibaldi in 1849.

References

Bibliography 
 Aldo Mazzolai, Guida della Maremma. Percorsi tra arte e natura, Le Lettere, Florence, 1997.

See also 
 Pian d'Alma
 Puntone di Scarlino
 Scarlino

Frazioni of Scarlino
Railway towns in Italy